Diplonema is a genus of free-living organisms in the Euglenozoa. They are distinguished from Rhynchopus in Class  Diplonemea by the absence of a fully flagellate dispersive stage.

Characteristics
Diplonema feature two short flagella of equal length and two subapical openings. Most are free living, but there have been reported cases of infection in clams and sudden decomposition of aquarium plants. It was described initially in 1914 and later rediscovered in the 60s and called Isonema, wrongly classified among euglenids.

References

Euglenozoa genera